Greatest Hits is the first compilation album by American country music artist Kenny Chesney, released on September 26, 2000 on BNA Records. It features hits from his previous albums, as well as newly recorded tracks. Two of the new tracks — "I Lost It" and "Don't Happen Twice" — were issued as singles. Also released from this album was a re-recording of his 1994 single "The Tin Man". Greatest Hits has been certified quadruple platinum by the Recording Industry Association of America (RIAA) for shipments of over four million copies in the United States.

Content
"I Lost It" was the first new release from this album, peaking at number three on the Billboard country charts. This song was co-written by Neil Thrasher along with Diamond Rio guitarist Jimmy Olander, and it features uncredited background vocals from Pam Tillis. Following it was "Don't Happen Twice", which in early 2001 became Chesney's fourth Billboard Number One. The third and final release from this album was a re-recording of "The Tin Man", which was previously released as a single in 1994 from his debut album In My Wildest Dreams, peaking at number 70 that year. The re-recording reached its peak of number 19 in mid-2001, and is his last single to miss the Top Ten. "For the First Time" and "Because of Your Love" are also new to this compilation.

"Back Where I Come From" is a live cover of a song originally released by Mac McAnally from his 1990 album Simple Life. Chesney previously covered this song on his 1996 album Me and You. "Fall in Love", the first single from his 1995 album All I Need to Know, was remixed for the album as well.

Track listing

Reception
MTV's music journalist Chet Flippo criticized the compilation album as a result of "mainstream Nashville labels and their major artists" concentrating on songs that fit the "radio and retail" ideals and push "artistic achievement" out, despite Chesney's talent and "pleasant voice". Flippo praised "That's Why I'm Here" and "Baptism" but panned "She Thinks My Tractor's Sexy", "How Forever Feels", and one of the album's four new songs "I Lost It", which he called "forgettable".

Personnel

 Eddie Bayers – drums
 Barry Beckett – keyboards
 Shannon Brown – background vocals
 Kenny Chesney – lead vocals
 Chad Cromwell – drums
 Eric Darken – percussion
 Sonny Garrish – steel guitar
 Rob Hajacos – fiddle
 Tim Hensley – banjo, acoustic guitar, background vocals
 Wes Hightower – background vocals
 John Hobbs – keyboards, organ, piano
 John Jorgenson – electric guitar
 "Cowboy" Eddie Long – steel guitar
 B. James Lowry – 12-string acoustic guitar, acoustic guitar, electric guitar
 Randy McCormick – keyboards
 Liana Manis – background vocals
 Phil Naish – keyboards
 Bobby Ogdin – piano
 Larry Paxton – bass guitar
 Don Potter – acoustic guitar
 Michael Rhodes – bass guitar
 Brent Rowan – electric guitar
 Michael Severs – electric guitar
 Joe Spivey – fiddle
 Harry Stinson – background vocals 
 Pam Tillis – background vocals on "I Lost It"
 Randy Travis – vocals on "Baptism"
 Phil Vassar – piano, background vocals
 Curtis Young – background vocals

Charts

Weekly charts

Year-end charts

Singles

Certifications

References

2000 greatest hits albums
Kenny Chesney albums
BNA Records compilation albums